Latežeris is a village in Druskininkai municipality, in Alytus County, in south Lithuania. According to the 2011 census, the village has a population of 35 people.

Latažeris village is located c.  from Druskininkai,  from Kermušija (the nearest settlement).

References

Works cited
 

Villages in Alytus County
Druskininkai Municipality